Stephen Ronald Aiken  (born 16 June 1962) is a Northern Irish politician, who served as Leader of the Ulster Unionist Party (UUP) from 2019 to 2021, and was Chief Whip of the UUP from 2017 to 2019.

Aiken has been a Member of the Northern Ireland Assembly (MLA) for South Antrim  since 2016.

Early life and education
Steve was born in South Antrim, attended Thompson Primary School, Ballyrobert, and then was educated at Belfast High School. During his naval career he undertook further study at King's College London (MA Defence Studies, 2001) and the University of Cambridge (MPhil, 2013; PhD, 2016 Queens' College). He joined the Sea Cadets in 1982 based at HMS Caroline (1914), which remains in its original dock as a Museum Ship.

Military career
Aiken served for 32 years in the Royal Navy as a submariner, ultimately in many senior operational roles, including commanding two nuclear-powered submarines, being Joint Plans Officer for operations in the Middle-East in 2002-04 (for which he was appointed an Officer of the Order of the British Empire (OBE)). At the end of his service in the Royal Navy, following a weekend of 'retirement', he became the founding CEO of the British Irish Chamber of Commerce, a post he held for three years during which time he lived in Dublin with his young family.

Political career

When Robin Swann MLA announced his sudden resignation as leader of the Ulster Unionist Party in 2019, Aiken stood for the leadership. He was elected unopposed as leader in November 2019 and led the party through difficult periods addressing concerns about Brexit, the Protocol and pandemic. He promptly opted for the UUP to take the Ministry of Health Department, when no other party would take it, and appointed Mr Swann MLA as Minister. He announced his resignation as leader eighteen months later, in May 2021, with the BBC citing "frustration" with his leadership within the party, and a conviction that change was needed. He was succeeded by Doug Beattie.

In October 2021 Aiken was reselected to be a UUP candidate for South Antrim in the 2022 Northern Ireland Assembly election, alongside Paul Michael. He was reelected in the May 2022 poll.

Current positions 

 Chairperson, Committee for Finance of the Northern Ireland Assembly
 Chairperson, All Party Group for STEM (Science, Technology, Engineering and  Mathematics)
 Chairperson, All Party Group for Ethnic Minorities
 Member, All Party Group for Climate Action
 Board member, Christian Aid Ireland

References

External links
Northern Ireland Assembly profile
Ulster Unionist Party profile

1962 births
Living people
Royal Navy officers
People educated at Belfast High School
Alumni of King's College London
Alumni of Queens' College, Cambridge
Ulster Unionist Party MLAs
Northern Ireland MLAs 2016–2017
Northern Ireland MLAs 2017–2022
Officers of the Order of the British Empire
Northern Ireland MLAs 2022–2027
Leaders of the Ulster Unionist Party